The Traitor (German: Verräter) is a 1936 German film directed by Karl Ritter.

Summary 
Foreign agents infiltrate the German arms industry helped by German traitors. However, they are defeated due to the combined efforts of the Wehrmacht and the Gestapo.

Plot
Foreign intelligence services are stepping up their efforts to uncover the secrets of the German arms industry. First, an agent is infiltrated into a German aircraft factory by equipping him with a false identity as a fitter and the code name "Schultz". A calm and capable man, he soon manages to become familiar with the latest aircraft models.

At the same time, the agent group in the capital Berlin places advertisements in which contacts to the industry are sought and good earning opportunities are offered. As a result, the highly indebted designer Brockau, who is desperately looking for new sources of money to finance the costly claims of his pleasure-seeking girlfriend Marion, gets in touch. Brockau, the inventor of a new type of crude oil carburetor, works in the T-Metallwerke, where the latest German tank models are developed. Therefore, he is the ideal catch for the agents and soon fidgets firmly in their net. Brockau gradually reveals and sells one secret after another to the agents.

Finally, the agents try to get the former banker and current tank soldier Klemm into their clutches, who is a shooter on a Panzerkampfwagen I. Klemm, who gives the agent Morris a harmless stock market tip, gets paid an alleged share of the profits from him. Later, Morris blackmails him with a fake receipt, in which Klemm allegedly confirms receipt of the money for the betrayal of state secrets. However, Klemm struggles to report the story to his superiors. These inform the defense of the Wehrmacht, which in cooperation with the Gestapo has been after the agent ring for some time.

Now it is possible to gradually uncover the agents. Schultz is the first to be caught, whose false identity bursts after being checked. Schultz is still able to start with a new dive bomber model, but is shot down on the Channel coast by a joint action of the Luftwaffe and Kriegsmarine. After that, Brockau, who was supposed to sabotage a waterworks on behalf of Morris, is caught red-handed. Afterwards, Morris can also be asked, who loses his game himself at the last minute. The last traitor, Geyer, escapes by train. But when he is stopped by the police, Geyer flees into a swamp, where he sinks miserably.

The film ends with an appeal from the tank department, where the execution of the traitor Brockau is announced. Soldier Klemm, on the other hand, receives a commendation for his courage in front of the assembled company.

Cast 
Lída Baarová as Marion
Willy Birgel as Agent Morris
Irene von Meyendorff as Hilde Körner
Theodor Loos as Dr. Auer
Rudolf Fernau as Fritz Brockau
Herbert A.E. Böhme as Agent Schultz
Heinz Welzel as Hans Klemm
Paul Dahlke as Agent Geyer
Josef Dahmen as Ein Helfer
Hans Zesch-Ballot as Dr. Wehner
Sepp Rist as Commissioner Kilian
Volker von Collande as Referendar Kröpke
Ernst Karchow as Major Walen
Siegfried Schürenberg as Lt. Col. Neumann
Otto Graf as Captain Dressler
Heinrich Schroth as General manager T-Metallwerke
Karl Junge-Swinburne as Tank division commander
Hans Henninger as Max
Carl Auen as Detective Assmann
Ewald Wenck as Detective Schober
Willi Rose as Ede
Gisela von Collande as Trude
Ernst Behmer as Photographer
Max Hochstetter
Hans Meyer-Hanno
Hans Reinhold Hauer
Hellmuth Passarge

External links 

1936 films
Films of Nazi Germany
1930s spy films
German spy films
1930s German-language films
German black-and-white films
Films directed by Karl Ritter
1930s German films